Yeldos Kuanyshuly Akhmetov  (Eldos Quanyşūly Ahmetov; born 1 June 1990) is a Kazakh footballer who plays as a defender for Taraz in the Kazakhstan Premier League.

Career
On 18 November 2016, Akhmetov signed a three-year contract with FC Kairat.
On 11 January 2020, FC Kaisar announced the signing of Akhmetov.

Career statistics

Club

International

Statistics accurate as of match played 11 November 2016

References

External links

1990 births
People from Taraz
Living people
Kazakhstani footballers
Kazakhstan international footballers
Association football defenders
FC Astana players
FC Irtysh Pavlodar players
FC Taraz players
FC Kairat players
Kazakhstan Premier League players
Kazakhstan under-21 international footballers